Allosmaitia is a genus of butterflies in the family Lycaenidae. The species are found in the Neotropical realm.

Species
Allosmaitia coelebs (Herrich-Schäffer, 1862)
Allosmaitia fidena (Hewitson, 1867)
Allosmaitia piplea (Godman & Salvin, 1896)
Allosmaitia strophius (Godart, [1824])
Allosmaitia myrtusa (Hewitson, 1867)

References

Eumaeini
Lycaenidae of South America
Lycaenidae genera